Chillesford Church Pit is a  geological Site of Special Scientific Interest in Chillesford, south of Saxmundham in Suffolk. It is a Geological Conservation Review site, and it is in the Suffolk Coast and Heaths Area of Outstanding Natural Beauty.

This site has deposits dating to the Early Pleistocene Bramertonian Stage, around 2.4 to 1.8 million years ago. Fossils of molluscs and pollen indicate a temperate climate dating to the Chillesford Crag formation. The Chillesford Clay and Chillesford Crag are parts for the Norwich Crag Formation.

The site is private land with no public access.

References

Sites of Special Scientific Interest in Suffolk
Geological Conservation Review sites